Benthomangelia enceladus is a species of sea snail, a marine gastropod mollusk in the family Mangeliidae.

Etymology
The specific epithet refers to the moon of Saturn, and is therefore a noun in apposition that does not agree in gender with the genus.

Description

Distribution
This marine species occurs in the Campos Basin, Southeast Brazil.

References

 Figueira, R. M. A.; Absalão, R. S. (2010). Deep-water Mangeliinae, Taraninae and Clathurellinae (Mollusca: Gastropoda: Conoidea: Turridae) from the Campos Basin, southeast Brazil. Scientia Marina. 74(4): 731–743

External links

enceladus
Gastropods described in 2010